Area code 276 is a telephone area code in the North American Numbering Plan (NANP) for the U.S. state of Virginia. It was established by a split of area code 540 on September 1, 2001.

Prior to October 2021, area code 276 had telephone numbers assigned for the central office code 988. In 2020, 988 was designated nationwide as a dialing code for the National Suicide Prevention Lifeline, which created a conflict for exchanges that permit seven-digit dialing. This area code was therefore scheduled to transition to ten-digit dialing by October 24, 2021.

Service area
The service area comprises the southwest corner of the Commonwealth of Virginia, including most of the New River Valley and the Virginia side of the Tri-Cities.

Within the service area are the following independent cities:

 Bristol
 Galax
 Martinsville
 Norton

The following counties are also located in the numbering plan area:

 Bland
 Buchanan
 Carroll
 Dickenson
 Grayson
 Henry
 Lee
 Patrick
 Russell
 Scott
 Smyth
 Tazewell
 Washington
 Wise
 Wythe

See also
List of Virginia area codes
List of NANP area codes

References

External links

List of exchanges from AreaCodeDownload.com, 276 Area Code

Telecommunications-related introductions in 2001
276
276
2001 establishments in Virginia